The XXIX Golden Grand Prix Ivan Yarygin 2018, also known as Ivan Yarygin (Yariguin) 2018 was a wrestling event held in Krasnoyarsk, Russia between 26 and 28 January 2018. It was held as the second of the ranking series of United World Wrestling,it is only men's freestyle ranking.

This international tournament includes competition in both men's and women's freestyle wrestling. This Grand Prix will be held in honor of the two time Olympic Champion, Ivan Yarygin. The Yarygin Grand Prix is the first UWW ranked  tournament of the year 2018.

Medal overview

Medal table

Men's freestyle

Women's freestyle

Participating nations
299 competitors from 20 nations participated.

 (5)
 (22)
 (12)
 (1)
 (2)
 (10)
 (1)
 (7) 
 (26) 
 (5)
 (3)
 (57) 
 (1)
 (81)
 (2)
 (10)
 (17)
 (2)
 (22)
 (13)

Ranking Series
Ranking Series Calendar 2018:
 1st Ranking Series: 25–26 January, Iran, Mahshahr  ⇒ 2018 Takhti Cup (GR)
 2nd Ranking Series: 26–28 January, Russia, Krasnoyarsk ⇒ Golden Grand Prix Ivan Yarygin 2018 (FS)
 3rd Ranking Series: 15–23 February, Cuba, La Havana ⇒ 2018  Granma y Cerro Pelado (FS,WW,GR)  
 4th Ranking Series: 16–18 February, Sweden, Klippan ⇒ Klippan Lady Open (2018) (WW) 
 5th Ranking Series: 9–10 June, Mongolia, Ulaanbaatar ⇒ 2018 Mongolia Open (FS,WW)
 6th Ranking Series: 22–23 June, China, Taiyuan ⇒ 2018 China Open (WW)
 7th Ranking Series: 23–24 June, Hungary, Győr ⇒ 2018 Hungarian Grand Prix (GR)
 8th Ranking Series: 3–5 July, Georgia, Tbilisi ⇒  2018 Tbilisi Grand Prix of V. Balavadze and G. Kartozia (FS,GR)
 9th Ranking Series: 20–22 July, Turkey, Istanbul ⇒  2018 Vehbi Emre & Hamit Kaplan Tournament (GR)
 10th Ranking Series: 27–20 July, Turkey, Istanbul ⇒  2018 Yasar Dogu Tournament (FS,WW)
 11th Ranking Series: 7–9 September, Poland, Warsaw  ⇒  Ziolkowski, Pytlasinski, Poland Open (FS,WW,GR)  
 12th Ranking Series: 14–16 September, Belarus, Minsk  ⇒  Medved (Test Event Minsk 2019)

References

External links 

 
Golden Grand Prix Ivan Yarygin
Golden Grand Prix Ivan Yarygin
2018 in sport wrestling
January 2018 sports events in Russia